The 1915 Army Cadets football team represented the United States Military Academy in the 1915 college football season. In their third season under head coach Charles Dudley Daly, the Cadets compiled a 5–3–1 record, shut out four of their nine opponents, and outscored all opponents by a combined total of 114 to 57.  In the annual Army–Navy Game, the Cadets  
 
Three Army players were recognized on the All-America team. Fullback Elmer Oliphant was selected as a first-team player by Walter Camp, Monty, and Damon Runyon. Center John McEwan was selected as a first-team All-American by Damon Runyon and a second-team player by Monty. Tackle Alex Weyand was selected as a second-team player by Monty and a third-team player by Walter Camp.

Schedule

References

Army
Army Black Knights football seasons
Army Cadets football